The Étincelle-class gunboat was a class of twelve gunboats built for the French Navy in 1855, used in the Crimean War.

Design
The Étincelle class was designed around a wooden hull and a steam and sail propulsion. They carried 50-pounder guns and an assortment of smaller riffled pieces.

Ships

Citations and references

Citations

References
 

Gunboat classes
Gunboats of the French Navy
Ship classes of the French Navy